The BMO Allan King Award for Best Documentary Film is an annual award given by the Toronto Film Critics Association to a film judged by the members of that body to be the year's best documentary film.

Winners

2000s

2010s

2020s

References

External links
Toronto Film Critics Association - Past Award Winners

Canadian documentary film awards